The Venus Throw is a historical novel by American author Steven Saylor, first published by St. Martin's Press in 1995. It is the fourth book in his Roma Sub Rosa series of mystery novels set in the final decades of the Roman Republic. The main character is the Roman sleuth Gordianus the Finder.

Plot summary
The year is 56 BC, and Gordianus is visited by his old friend and teacher Dio, a diplomat who leads an embassy on behalf of the citizens of Egypt, who want to make a complaint about their king Ptolemy XII to the senate of Rome. Dio is afraid that he will be murdered by the king's agents, like other envoys before him. When he is poisoned shortly after, Gordianus attempts to find the murderer. His main suspect is the orator Marcus Caelius Rufus, and he also meets the sultry widow Clodia and her admirer, the poet Catullus.

Roma Sub Rosa
1995 American novels
56 BC